The Frente de Liberación Homosexual (Spanish: Homosexual Liberation Front or FLH), was the first public gay liberation in Mexico. Was led and co founded by lesbian activist Nancy Cárdenas in 1971.

History 
After Stonewall riots, in the early 1970s a group of people from different sexual diversities began regular meetings in Mexico City to discuss the oppressive situation they lived. Among them were actress and activist Nancy Cárdenas and writer and student activist Luis González de Alba. Carlos Monsiváis would have given Cárdenas documents from American Gay Liberation Front, motivating Cárdenas to found a formal group. She organized formal meetings that raise awareness among others about the importance of sexual diversity in the Mexican society. Some of the members of these circle had participated in social movements such as Movement of 1968.

As a result of these meetings, the FLH was founded on August 15, 1971, in Mexico City. Meetings was conducted as a secret space given the repressive politic to social movements under the government of Luis Echeverría and homophobic behaviors in Mexican society. FLH activities included exercises of self-acceptance and recognition of individual and collective sexual diversity. The group was dissolved in 1973.

References 

LGBT rights in Mexico
1971 establishments in Mexico
Defunct organizations based in Mexico
1973 disestablishments in Mexico
LGBT organizations in Mexico